The 1975 Los Angeles Times 500 was a NASCAR Winston Cup Series race that took place on November 23, 1975, at Ontario Motor Speedway in Ontario, California.

This was the last race where the car's model year was part of the race info. From 1975 onwards, the passenger vehicles that people actually drove in real life started to deviate from the stock cars exhibited in NASCAR due to environmental regulations on the automobile industry. The gulf between NASCAR vehicles and regular passenger automobiles started to become even greater throughout the 1970s, 1980s, and 1990s. By the 21st century, regular passenger vehicles had nothing to do with the NASCAR vehicles except for the manufacturer name and the model of the vehicle.

Race report
Two hundred laps were completed in three hours and thirty-three minutes on the paved track spanning . More than 50,000 spectators see Buddy Baker defeat David Pearson by 29.4 seconds in the #15 Norris Industries Ford machine. Only one caution for nine laps slowed the action. The total prize purse was $140,775 ($ when adjusted for inflation); Baker would receive $35,300 of it ($ when adjusted for inflation) while Negre earned $1,050 ($ when adjusted for inflation).

Out of the 40-driver grid, 39 were American-born while Roy Smith was a Canadian. Cecil Gordon had engine problems that put him out of the race on lap 141; which nearly destroyed his vehicle. A tie-rod end had backed out and was just hanging on.

Ed Negre would be the last-place finisher due to an engine problem on the second lap. Richard Childress finished tenth in his final race at the wheel of Tom Garn's #96. Childress became an owner-driver for 1976 and changed numbers to #3.

Notable crew chiefs in this race were Tim Brewer, Travis Carter, Harry Hyde, Dale Inman, Bud Moore among others. Carl Adams; Jim Boyd; Don Hall and John Martin all made what would be their final starts in NASCAR's top series.

Richard Petty had already clinched his sixth NASCAR championship; defeating Dave Marcis in the standings by more than 700 points.

Qualifying

Finishing order
Section reference: 

 Buddy Baker (No. 15)
 David Pearson (No. 21)
 Dave Marcis (No. 71)
 Cale Yarborough (No. 11)
 Bobby Allison (No. 16)
 Lennie Pond (No. 54)
 Jimmy Insolo (No. 38)
 Dick Brooks† (No. 90)
 James Hylton† (No. 48)
 Richard Childress (No. 96)
 Don Hall (No. 01)
 David Sisco (No. 05)
 D.K. Ulrich (No. 40)
 A. J. Foyt* (No. 28)
 Don Huffman (No. 63)
 Richard Petty* (No. 43)
 Frank Warren* (No. 79)
 Hugh Pearson* (No. 76)
 Cecil Gordon*† (No. 24)
 Walter Ballard* (No. 30)
 J.D. McDuffie*† (No. 70)
 Elmo Langley*† (No. 64)
 Tom Williams* (No. 39)
 John Kieper* (No. 98W)
 Ray Elder*† (No. 96W)
 Bruce Hill* (No. 47)
 Jim Boyd* (No. 31)
 Carl Adams* (No. 65)
 Roy Smith*† (No. 29)
 John Martin* (No. 2)
 Hershel McGriff* (No. 26)
 Jim Thirkettle* (No. 5)
 Bill Schmitt* (No. 73)
 Benny Parsons*† (No. 72)
 Chuch Wahl* (No. 37)
 Richie Panch*† (No. 98)
 Don Puskarich* (No. 10)
 Chuck Bown* (No. 03)
 Sonny Easley*† (No. 68)
 Ed Negre* (No. 8)

† signifies that the driver is known to be deceased 
* Driver failed to finish race

Standings after the race

References

Los Angeles Times 500
Los Angeles Times 500
NASCAR races at Ontario Motor Speedway